Judith Meauri (born 5 April 1992) is a Papua New Guinean swimmer. She competed in the women's 50m freestyle at the 2012 Summer Olympics in London, finishing with a time of 27.84 seconds in 47th place in the heats. She competed at the 2020 Summer Olympics, in Women's 50 m freestyle.

Life 
She was born in Port Moresby. 

Meauri competed in swimming at the 2011 Pacific Games with the Papua New Guinean team, where she won a bronze medal in 4x100m freestyle relay, a bronze medal in 4x200m freestyle relay, and a bronze medal in 4x100m medley relay.

References

External links

1992 births
Living people
People from the National Capital District (Papua New Guinea)
Papua New Guinean female swimmers
Olympic swimmers of Papua New Guinea
Swimmers at the 2012 Summer Olympics
Commonwealth Games competitors for Papua New Guinea
Swimmers at the 2006 Commonwealth Games
Swimmers at the 2010 Commonwealth Games
Papua New Guinean female freestyle swimmers
Swimmers at the 2020 Summer Olympics